The 1924–25 season is the 51st season of competitive football by Rangers.

Overview
Rangers played a total of 43 competitive matches during the 1924–25 season. The team finished top of the league, three points ahead of second placed Airdrieonians, after winning twenty-five of the 38 league games and recording an unbeaten home record.

The side was knocked out of the Scottish Cup at the semi-final stage that season. After overcoming East Fife, Montrose, Arbroath and Kilmarnock, a 5-0 defeat to Celtic ended the campaign.

Results
All results are written with Rangers' score first.

Scottish League Division One

Scottish Cup

Appearances

See also
1924–25 in Scottish football
1924–25 Scottish Cup

Rangers F.C. seasons
Rangers
Scottish football championship-winning seasons